Bulbophyllum argyropus, commonly known as the silver strand orchid,  is a species of epiphytic or sometimes lithophytic orchid that is endemic to eastern Australia, including Lord Howe and Norfolk Islands. It has crowded pseudobulbs, tough, dark green leaves and up to four small whitish to yellowish flowers with an orange labellum.

Description
Young pseudobulbs are covered with papery white bracts. Flowering occurs between August and December.

Taxonomy and naming
The silver strand orchid was first formally described in 1833 by Stephan Endlicher who gave it the name Thelychiton argyropus and published the description in Prodromus Florae Norfolkicae. In 1876, Heinrich Gustav Reichenbach changed the name to Bulbophyllum argyropus. The specific epithet (argyropus) is derived from the Ancient Greek words argyros meaning "silver" and pous meaning "foot".

Distribution and habitat
Bulbophyllum argyropus usually grows on the highest branches of rainforest trees, rarely on rocks. It occurs between the McPherson Range in Queensland and the Dorrigo Plateau in New South Wales as well as on Lord Howe and Norfolk Islands. It has also been reported from New Caledonia.

References 

argyropus
Orchids of New South Wales
Flora of Lord Howe Island
Flora of Norfolk Island
Orchids of Queensland
Endemic orchids of Australia
Plants described in 1833